Marja Obrębska (14 February 1904 – 9 October 1995) was a Polish painter. Her work was part of the painting event in the art competition at the 1932 Summer Olympics.

References

1904 births
1995 deaths
20th-century Polish painters
Polish women painters
Olympic competitors in art competitions
Artists from Vinnytsia
20th-century Polish women